Meadow House is the nom de plume of English musician, instrument builder and composer, Dan Wilson. Meadow House came to prominence after airplay on London's radio station, Resonance FM. His debut album, Tongue Under a Ton of Nine Volters, was released on the Alcohol Records record label in 2006. He was the winner of the 2007 Arts Foundation fellowship for electroacoustic music and was Sound and Music's "Embedded" composer-in-residence between 2014 and 2016 at Resonance FM. He is known to employ unusual methods of distributing his work, such as leaving cassettes or CDs anonymously in public places.

Discography

Albums
 For Thee (cassette) - Cistern Overflow
 Making Naff Plumbers Blush (CD) - Cistern Overflow
 Hearts Should Fear Cloudy Counsel (CD) - Cistern Overflow
 Tongue Under a Ton Of Nine Volters (CD) - Alcohol Records
 Radionics Radio: An Album of Musical Radionic Thought Frequencies (2016) - Sub Rosa

Singles
 Ashfordaisyak/ARC Split as Ashfordaisyak (CD) - Menschenfiend Productions
 "The Hermit" b/w "Leper In A Tumbledryer" (7") - Jonathon Whiskey

Appears on compilations
 "Printar Study" - Leonardo Music Journal No. 17 My Favorite Supplement: The Joy of the Gizmo
 "Tit For Tat" - The Wire Tapper No. 12 - The Wire issue 250
 "The Penguin Story" - Unknown Public No. 14 Bloody Amateurs

References

External links
Dan Wilson's Youtube account
 

Living people
English electronic musicians
Year of birth missing (living people)
Place of birth missing (living people)